Jaumea is a genus of flowering plants in the family Asteraceae. The plants are sprawling perennial herbs branching mostly from the base. Flower heads are yellow, with disc flowers and also usually with ray flowers.

The genus is named for French botanist J. H. Jaume St. Hilaire, 1772–1845.

 Species
 Jaumea carnosa (Less.) A.Gray - British Columbia, Washington, Oregon, California, Baja California, Sonora, Jalisco
 Jaumea chevalieri O.Hoffm. - tropical Africa
 Jaumea helenae Buscal. & Muschl. - Zimbabwe
 Jaumea linearifolia (Juss.) DC. - Uruguay, northeastern Argentina
 Jaumea linearis Pers. - Brazil
 Jaumea peduncularis (Hook. & Arn.) Benth. & Hook.f. ex Oliv. - Jalisco
 Jaumea rotundifolia Mattf. - Cameroon

References

Tageteae
Asteraceae genera